The Reynier Speer House is located in Little Falls, Passaic County, New Jersey, United States. The house was built in 1785 by Reynier Speer and was added to the National Register of Historic Places on July 18, 1985. An earlier building from 1680 occupied the location.

See also
National Register of Historic Places listings in Passaic County, New Jersey

References

Houses on the National Register of Historic Places in New Jersey
Houses completed in 1785
Houses in Passaic County, New Jersey
National Register of Historic Places in Passaic County, New Jersey
New Jersey Register of Historic Places
Little Falls, New Jersey